South California can mean one of these four terms:

 Southern California
 South California Purples
 Baja California
 South California (proposed U.S. state)